The Newberry Correctional Facility is a state prison for men, owned and operated by the Michigan Department of Corrections. It is located in the eastern Upper Peninsula of Michigan, on the south side of Newberry, in Luce County.

The facility was opened in 1996 and has a working capacity of 1108 prisoners, held at a medium security level.

References

Prisons in Michigan
Buildings and structures in Luce County, Michigan
1996 establishments in Michigan